Jacques Labertonnière (12 January 1927 – 8 February 2019) was a French racing cyclist. He rode in the 1953 Tour de France.

References

1927 births
2019 deaths
French male cyclists
Place of birth missing